Alwadi is a village in Chalisgaon taluka of Jalgaon district  in the state of Maharashtra, India.

Geography
It has an average elevation of 344 metres (1128 feet). It is also located near the Manyar Dam, and a canal off of the dam provides irrigation for the village.

Economy
Sugarcane is the major agricultural product and is the basis for the local sugar refining and rum distilling industries. Other major crops include cotton, groundnuts, onion, banana, wheat, gram, and other vegetables and grains (bajra, jovar, tur etc.).

Transport

Rail

Road
Alwadi is about 39 km from National Highway 3 and 23 km from state highway 211. A state transport bus is available from Chalisgaon to Alwadi. Private vehicles are also available from Takali and Saygaon.

References

Villages in Jalgaon district